John Stephenson (born 26 March 1955) is a South African former cricketer. He played in 31 first-class and 10 List A matches between 1974/75 and 1984/84.

See also
 List of Eastern Province representative cricketers

References

External links
 

1955 births
Living people
South African cricketers
Eastern Province cricketers
KwaZulu-Natal cricketers
People from Makhanda, Eastern Cape
Cricketers from the Eastern Cape